Brudet, brodet or brodeto is a fish stew made in Croatian regions of Dalmatia, Kvarner and Istria, as well as along the coast of Montenegro; the brodetto di pesce, or simply brodetto (broeto in Lingua veneta, Brudèt ad pès in Romagnol dialect, el brudèt in Fanese, el brudettu in Portorecanatese, lu vrëdètte in Sambenedettese, lu vredòtte in  Giulianova dialect, u' Bredette in Termolese, lu vrudàtte in Vastese dialect) is the signature dish of almost all Italian Adriatic coastal cities (famous are fish stews from Venetian Lagoon, Romagna, Marche, Abruzzo, and Molise). It consists of several types of fish stewed with spices, vegetables and red or white wine,  or even vinegar, and the most important aspect of brudet is its simplicity of preparation and the fact that it is typically prepared in a single pot. It is usually served with polenta or toasted bread which soaks up the fish broth, while other recipes serve it with potatoes or bread. Brudets can significantly vary in style, composition and flavor, depending upon the types of ingredients and cooking styles used.

Similar dishes
A similar dish from Corfu is known as Bourdeto.

See also
 List of stews

References

Croatian stews
Montenegrin cuisine
Mediterranean cuisine
Fish stews
Foods with alcoholic drinks
Cuisine of Abruzzo